Maulana Rehmatullah Khalil was a Pakistani politician who served as members of the 12th National Assembly of Pakistan from 16 November 2002 -02-10-2007.

References

Pakistani Islamic religious leaders
Pakistani Sunni Muslims
Pakistani MNAs 2002–2007
People from Peshawar
Jamiat Ulema-e-Islam (F) politicians